Balu Qayah (also Romanized as Bālū Qayah and Bāllūqīyeh; also known as Antarballī and Gagīvard) is a village in Meshgin-e Gharbi Rural District, in the Central District of Meshgin Shahr County, Ardabil Province, Iran. At the 2006 census, its population was 133, in 25 families.

References 

Towns and villages in Meshgin Shahr County